Hollóháza is a village in Borsod-Abaúj-Zemplén County in northeastern Hungary. The village is famous for its porcelain made here.

References

Populated places in Borsod-Abaúj-Zemplén County